The 2023 Turkish floods were a series of devastating floods that occurred in two Turkish provinces,  Şanlıurfa and  Adıyaman, on 15 March 2023. The floods were caused by torrential rains that occurred just one month after a deadly earthquake struck the same regions.

Impact
At least 18 people died in the floods; 16 in Şanlıurfa and two in Adıyaman. Among the dead included a one-year-old child. Several others were missing. A container home in Tut, where earthquake survivors were living, was swept away, killing two people, and four others were reported missing. In Şanlıurfa, five Syrian nationals were found dead inside a flooded basement apartment, while two other bodies were retrieved from a trapped van at an underpass. Additionally, four people were killed, and two firefighters were reported missing.

The floods caused extensive damage, and several people were evacuated from a drenched campsite where earthquake survivors were sheltering in tents. In Şanlıurfa, the intensive care unit of the Eyyübiye Training and Research Hospital was flooded, forcing 25 patients to be evacuated. Floods affected traffic; an underpass in Haliliye District was flooded and trapped many people in vehicles. Nearly 2,000 homes and offices were damaged in the province.

Rescue operations
The Turkish disaster management agency reported that more than a dozen professional divers were involved in the rescue efforts in each of the two provinces. Firefighters rescued trapped vehicle occupants at an underpass in Haliliye District.

Impact on earthquake survivors
The floods have increased the misery of thousands of people who were already left homeless and displaced by the earthquake that struck the same region on 6 February 2023, which resulted in the deaths of more than 56,000 people, and collapsed or severely damaged 200,000 buildings.

Response
The Turkish government pledged to provide assistance to those affected by the floods and urged citizens to remain vigilant and take necessary precautions during the ongoing severe weather conditions.

Deputy chairman for the Republican People's Party, Ali Öztunç, criticized the Justice and Development Party, calling them incompetent and uninterested in assisting the affected.

On 15 March, the General Directorate of Meteorology said rain was expected in the earthquake-affected area for the next five days.

References

Floods
2023 floods in Asia
Floods
Floods
2023
History of Adıyaman Province
History of Şanlıurfa Province